John Frederick Rowley (7 October 1918 – 28 June 1998) was an English footballer who played as a forward from the 1930s to the 1950s, mainly remembered for a 17-year spell with Manchester United. He was nicknamed "The Gunner" because of his prolific  goalscoring  and explosive shooting, scoring 211 goals in 424 appearances for United. His younger brother, Arthur, still holds the record for the highest number of career goals scored in the Football League with 434.

Career
Rowley started his professional career in 1935 with Wolverhampton Wanderers, although he never found a place in the first team. He soon moved on to Birmingham & District League club Cradley Heath, from where, in February 1937, he signed for Bournemouth & Boscombe Athletic, scoring ten goals in his first 11 games. His talent soon brought him to the attention of larger clubs and Rowley was purchased eight months later by Manchester United for £3,000. Still only 17, his debut for the club came on 23 October 1937 against Sheffield Wednesday. In his second game, he scored four goals against Swansea Town. By the time senior football was suspended due to the outbreak of World War II in September 1939, he had played 58 times for United, scoring 18 goals and helping them win promotion back to the First Division in his first season.

Initially bought as an outside left, he was to develop into a highly effective centre-forward in Matt Busby's first United team. He was part of the team that won the FA Cup in 1948, scoring two goals in the final, and the 1951–52 Football League. He became one of the club's few players to have scored five goals in a single game, when in February 1949 he scored five goals in an 8–0 win over Yeovil Town in an FA Cup tie.

Rowley is one of only four players in the history of Manchester United to score over 200 goals for the club, the others being Bobby Charlton, Denis Law and Wayne Rooney. He left the club in 1955 to become player–manager of Plymouth Argyle.

He later went on to manage Oldham Athletic, gaining promotion to the Third Division in 1963. From there, he went on to manage Dutch club Ajax for the 1963–64 season, before returning to Britain to manage Wrexham and Bradford (Park Avenue) F.C., followed by a second spell at Oldham, where he finished his managerial career in December 1969.

Rowley was also capped six times for England scoring six goals, four of which came against Northern Ireland on 16 November 1949

Rowley died in June 1998, at the age of 79.

Career statistics

Player

Manager

Honours

Player
Manchester United
Football League First Division: 1951–52
FA Cup: 1947–48
FA Community Shield: 1952

Manager
Plymouth Argyle
Football League Third Division: 1958–59

Oldham Athletic
Football League Fourth Division promotion: 1962–63

References

External links
 Greens on Screen

1918 births
1998 deaths
Association football forwards
English footballers
England international footballers
England wartime international footballers
Footballers from Oldham
Wolverhampton Wanderers F.C. players
Cradley Heath F.C. players
AFC Bournemouth players
Manchester United F.C. players
Plymouth Argyle F.C. players
Aldershot F.C. wartime guest players
English football managers
Plymouth Argyle F.C. managers
Oldham Athletic A.F.C. managers
Wrexham A.F.C. managers
English Football League managers
People from Shaw and Crompton
Footballers from Wolverhampton
English expatriate football managers
English Football League players
English Football League representative players
Bradford (Park Avenue) A.F.C. managers
FA Cup Final players
English expatriate sportspeople in the Netherlands
Expatriate football managers in the Netherlands